Thomas Webb, MA  was Dean of Kilmore from 1768 to his death in 1797.

References

Irish Anglicans
Alumni of Trinity College Dublin
Deans of Kilmore
1797 deaths